Gioacchino (Joachim) Pettoletti (born 1792) was a European composer who lived in Copenhagen, St. Petersburg, and possibly elsewhere.

References 

1792 births
19th-century composers
Year of death missing